Different 'Round Here is the debut studio album by American country music singer Riley Green. It was released on September 20, 2019 via BMLG Records.

Content
The album includes three singles: "There Was This Girl", "In Love by Now", and "I Wish Grandpas Never Died". In addition to these, Green also released "Numbers on the Cars" and "Bettin' Man" digitally prior to the album's release. Dann Huff is the album's producer.

Critical reception
Stephen Thomas Erlewine of AllMusic wrote that "What keeps Different 'Round Here humming is how Green manages to avoid the temptation of succumbing to straight-ahead revivalism. He takes old-fashioned attitude and simple, lean arrangements and plays them with a fresh directness. His straight-ahead nature may indeed lead him toward cornball territory, but the album on the whole is distinguished by how Green wears his heart on his sleeve."

Commercial performance
The album has sold 11,200 copies in the United States as of March 2020.

Track listing

Personnel
Adapted from liner notes.

Mike Brignardello - bass guitar
Dan Dugmore - pedal steel guitar
Shawn Fichter - drums
Paul Franklin - pedal steel guitar
Riley Green - lead vocals
Lee Hendricks - bass guitar
Dann Huff - electric guitar, mandolin, percussion
Charlie Judge - Hammond B-3 organ, keyboards
Chris McHugh - drums
Rob McNelley - electric guitar
Billy Nobel - keyboards
Justin Ostrander - electric guitar
Russ Pahl - pedal steel guitar
Danny Rader - acoustic guitar
Jerry Roe - drums
Scotty Sanders - pedal steel guitar
Jimmie Lee Sloas - bass guitar
Russell Terrell - background vocals
Ilya Toshinsky - acoustic guitar, electric guitar, mandolin

Charts

Weekly charts

Year-end charts

References

2019 albums
Big Machine Records albums
Riley Green (singer) albums
Albums produced by Dann Huff